Fushun County, is one of the three counties under the administration of the prefecture-level city of Fushun, in the east of Liaoning province, China.

Administrative Divisions
There are four towns, six townships, and two ethnic townships in the county.

Towns:
Zhangdang, Shiwen, Hou'an, Hada

Townships:
Xiahe Township, Jiubing Township, Hailang Township, Maquanzi Township, Shangma Township, Lanshan Township, Lagu Manchu Ethnic Township, Tangtu Manchu Ethnic Township

References

External links

 
Fushun
County-level divisions of Liaoning